Minnie Palmer (March 31, 1857 – May 21, 1936) was an American actress in dramatic and musical plays.

Early years 
Born in Philadelphia, Palmer supplemented her convent education by studying languages, dancing, and singing abroad.

Career 
Palmer debuted on Broadway in 1876. Her Broadway credits included Lightnin''' (1918), My Partner (1879), and Baby (1878). Other productions in which she acted were The Day After the Wedding, The Little Rebel, and The Cricket on the Hearth.

Palmer's performances in My Sweetheart had a lasting effect, as described in an article in the February 1915 issue of Motion Picture Magazine: "The American woman in an English theater is always of the soubret type, due ... to the phenomenal success of Minnie Palmer when she originally produced My Sweetheart in London." A side effect of that success was that Palmer became so identified with girlish roles that she rarely could find success in other roles.

A 1924 newspaper article described Palmer as "a full-fledged star at sixteen", adding that she "played the one role, My Sweetheart for sixteen years." Performances of My Sweetheart'' in England enhanced her status with the public and with critics. The 1885-1887 touring production also took Palmer and the company to Germany, Switzerland, Australia, New Zealand, and eight other countries.

Personal life 
Palmer married John R. Rogers, her manager, but they later divorced. Her next husband was Francis Jerrard, "a rich Englishman". She left acting and accompanied Jerrard to England, where they lived in "a sumptuous mansion".

Confusion of identies 
In the 1910s, some confusion arose when Minnie Marx, of the Marx Brothers family, assumed the name Minnie Palmer. The newer entertainer's use of the name caused confusion to researchers, "who continue to include both in the same files."

Death
On May 21, 1936, Palmer died in Bay Shore, Louisiana.

References
 

1857 births
1936 deaths
American stage actresses
Actresses from Philadelphia
19th-century American actresses
20th-century American actresses